The George Pal Memorial Award is presented each year, by the Academy of Science Fiction, Fantasy and Horror Films, in conjunction with their annual Saturn Award ceremony. The award is given to those who have shown exemplary work in the respective film genres. It is named in honor of George Pal, a Hungarian-born American animator and film producer, principally associated with the science fiction genre.

The latest honoree is screenwriter and film producer Simon Kinberg as of June 2022.

Recipients
Below is a list of recipients and the year the award was presented:

1970s
 C. Dean Anderson (1975)
 Don Fanzo (1975)
 Gloria Swanson (1975)
 Fay Wray (1975)

1980s
 John Badham (1980)
 Nicholas Meyer (1984)
 Douglas Trumbull (1985)
 Charles Band (1986)
 Arnold Leibovit (1987)
 Larry Cohen (1988)
 David Cronenberg (1989)

1990s
 William Friedkin (1991)
 Gene Roddenberry (1992)
 Frank Marshall (1993)
 Wah Chang (1994)
 Gene Warren (1994)
 Stan Winston (1994)
 Robert Zemeckis (1995)
 John Carpenter (1996)
 Kathleen Kennedy (1997)
 Dean Devlin (1998)
 Ray Bradbury (1999)

2000s
 Douglas Wick (2000)
 Sam Raimi (2001)
 Samuel Z. Arkoff (2002)
 Ridley Scott (2004)
 Ray Harryhausen (2006)
 Guillermo del Toro (2008)

2010s
 Alex Kurtzman (2010)
 Roberto Orci (2010)
 Martin Scorsese (2012)
 Gregory Nicotero (2014)
 Simon Kinberg (2015)

References

External links
 Official Saturn Awards website

Saturn Awards
Lifetime achievement awards
Mass media science fiction awards
Fantasy awards
Awards established in 1975